Hayagriva, also spelled Hayagreeva ( IAST), is a Hindu deity, the horse-headed avatar of Vishnu. The purpose of this incarnation was to slay a danava also named Hayagriva (A descendant of Kashyapa and Danu), who had the neck of a horse and the body of a human.

Iconography

Hayagriva is an avatar of the god Vishnu. He is worshipped as the god of knowledge and wisdom, with a human body and a horse's head, brilliant white in color, with white garments and seated on a white lotus. Symbolically, the story represents the triumph of pure knowledge, guided by the hand of Divinity, over the demonic forces of passion and darkness.

Vedanta Desika's dhyāna-śloka (meditative verse) on Hayagriva typifies this deity's depiction in Hindu iconography:

He has four hands, with one in the mode of bestowing knowledge; another holds books of wisdom, and the other two hold the Conch and Discus. His beauty, like fresh cut crystal, is an auspicious brilliance that never decays. May this Lord of speech who showers such cooling rays of grace on me be forever manifest in my heart!

In several other sources he is a white horse who pulls the sun into the sky every morning. In others such as the great epic Taraka-battle where the demigods are fallen on and attacked by the Danava's [demons], Vishnu appears as a great ferocious warrior called Hayagriva when he comes to their aid. It says: "Hayagriva appears in his chariot, drawn by 1,000 powerful steeds, crushing the enemies of the gods beneath him!" There are many other references to Hayagriva throughout the Mahabharata.

It is said that Vishnu comes from battle as a conqueror in the magnificent mystic form of the great and terrible Hayagriva:

The great Hayagriva having been praised in this way by the different saints and ascetics, assumes a great white horses head. The verda’s [mantras] made up his shape, his body built of all the great demigods; in the middle of his head was Shiva, in his heart was Brahmā; the rays of sun (Marichi) were his mane, the sun and moon his eyes; the Vasus and Sadhyas were his legs, in all his bones were the demigods. Agni [Ka-ten; god of fire] was his tongue, the goddess Satya his speech, while his knees were formed by the Maruts and Varuna. Having assumed this form, an awesome wonder to behold to the demigods, he vanquished the asura, and cast them down, with eyes that were red with anger.

Invariably, Hayagriva is depicted seated, most often with his right hand either blessing the supplicant or in the vyākhyā mudrā pose of teaching. The right hand also usually holds a akṣa-mālā (rosary), indicating his identification with meditative knowledge. His left holds a book, indicating his role as a teacher. His face is always serene and peaceful, if not smiling. Unlike his Buddhist counterpart, there is no hint of a fearsome side in the Hindu description of this deity.

Hayagriva is sometimes worshiped in a solitary pose of meditation, as in temple in Thiruvanthipuram. This form is known as Yoga-Hayagriva. However, he is most commonly worshipped along with his consort Lakshmi and is known as Lakshmi-Hayagriva. Hayagriva in this form is the presiding deity of Mysore's Parakala Mutt, a significant Sri Vaishnavism monastic institution.

Shakta tradition 

A legend has it that during the creation, the demons Madhu-Kaitabha stole the Vedas from Brahma, and Vishnu then took the Hayagriva form to recover them. The two bodies of Madhu and Kaitabha disintegrated into twelve pieces (two heads, two torsos, four arms and four legs). Yet another legend has it that during the creation, Vishnu compiled the Vedas in the Hayagrīva form.

Some consider Hayagriva to be one of the Dashavataras of the Supreme Personality of Godhead. He, along with Śrī Krishna, Shrī Rama and Shri Narasimha, is considered to be an important avatar of the Supreme Personality of Godhead.

Lord Hayagriva is also amongst the deities present at the Ranganathaswamy Temple, Srirangam. Hayagreeva in Srirangam is very famous for children's education. The sanctum sanctorum of the inner temple is very beautiful and all rituals are done according to Vedic principles very strictly.

Mahabharata, book 12, chapter 348, says the following:

Having compassed the destruction of the two Asuras and restored the Vedas to Brahma, the Supreme Being dispelled the grief of Brahma. Aided then by Hari and assisted by the Vedas, Brahma created all the worlds with their mobile and immobile creatures. After this, Hari, granting unto the Grandsire intelligence of the foremost order relating to the Creation, disappeared there and then for going to the place he had come from. It was thus that Narayana, having assumed the form equipped with the horse-head, slew the two Danavas Madhu and Kaitabha (and disappeared from the sight of Brahma).

Worship

Origins about the worship of Hayagriva have been researched, some of the early evidences dates back to 2,000 BCE, when people worshipped the horse for its speed, strength, intelligence. Hayagriva is one of the prominent deities in Vaikhanasas, Sri Vaishnavism and Madhwa Brahmins traditions. His blessings are sought when beginning study of both sacred and secular subjects. Special worship is conducted on the day of the full moon in August (Śravaṇa-Paurṇamī) (his avatāra-dina) and on Mahanavami, the ninth day of the Navaratri festival. He is also hailed as "Hayasirsa". Hayaśirṣa means haya=Horse, śirṣa=Head.

A verse originally from the Pañcarātra Agamas but is now popularly prefixed to the Hayagriva Stotram of the 13th-century poet-philosopher Vedanta Desika is very popular among devotees of Hayagrīva:

In IAST
jñānānandamayaṃ devaṃ nirmalasphaṭikākṛtiṃ
ādhāraṃ sarvavidyānāṃ hayagrīvaṃ upāsmahe

In Devanāgarī
ज्ञानानन्दमयं देवं निर्मलस्फटिकाकृतिं
आधारं सर्वविद्यानां हयग्रीवं उपास्महे

A great devotee named Śrī Vadirajatirtha of Udupi Śrī Kṛṣṇa Mutt used to offer cooked horse gram (Kollu) to Lord Hayagreeva. He used to recite the Hayagrīva Śloka and keep the offerings on his head. Lord Hayagrīva would come in the form of a beautiful white horse and would eat the horse gram. As a very staunch devotee, Vadirajatirtha would recite the following sloka:

Sanskrit translation-

Na HayagrivAth Param Asthi MangaLam

Na HayagrivAth Param Asthi Paavanam

Na HayagrivAth Param Asthi Dhaivatham

Na Hayagrivam Pranipathya Seedhathi!

English translation-

There is no auspiciousness greater than Hayagrivan.

Nothing is more sacred than Sri Hayagrivan to destroy our accumulated sins.

No other God is superior to Hayagrivan.

No one grieves after performing Śaraṇagati at the sacred feet of Hayagrivan.

Hayagriva is listed as one of the ten incarnations of Vishnu in Canto 10 (skandh 10), chapter 40 of the Śrīmadbhagavatam, and Akrūra's prayer contains Hayagriva's name when he had a vision while bathing in Yamuna.

There is a story that more than 500 years ago, a devotee from the Daivajña Brahmin community was casting an idol of Lord Gaṇapati, when it shaped itself in the image of Lord Hayagriva. Sarvabhauma Sri Vadiraja Guru Swamiji had a dream about this legend which inspired him to approach that devotee and take the idol from him in reverence. He then installed it in Shri Sode Vadiraja Mutt. Since then it has been worshipped there as the originating God of the Daivajnya Brahmin community. The members of the community who were originally Smartha Brahmins, were instructed in Dvaita philosophy and received into the fold as Mukhya Śiṣyas by the revered Sri Vadiraja Teertha. To this day, Daivajña Brahmins continue to make offerings to the Mutt and Lord Hayagriva.

Temples

Assam
 Hayagriv Madhav Dol at Hajo, Assam

Tamil Nadu
Most of the major Vishnu temples in Tamil Nadu have a separate shrine for Lord Hayagriva.
 Sri Lakshmi Hayagriva Temple, Thiruvaheendrapuram, Cuddalore, Tamil Nadu
 Sri Hyagreevar Temple, adjacent to Sri Koodal Alagar Perumal Koil, Madurai
 Sri Hyagreevar Swamy, Sri Chidambara Vinayagar Thirukoil, A. Vellalapatti (7 km from Alagarkoil or Melur), Madurai.
 Lakshmi hayagrivar temple in chithambara Nagar, near Ganapathi mill, at Tirunelveli
 Sri Lakshmi Hayagreevar perumal, at Sri Kothandaramaswamy Devasthanam, Perumudivakkam, near Kannigaipair (Chennai - Periyapalayam Highway), Thiruvallur District - 601103.
 Yoga Hayagreevar and Gnana Saraswathi in Vaitheeswaran Koil, Munusamy St, Amrithammal Colony, Perambur, Chennai - 600 011
 Chettypunyam Hayagriva Temple, near Chengalpattu, Tamil Nadu
 Sri Lakshmi Hayagriva Temple, Nanganallur, Chennai, Tamil Nadu.
 Lord Hayagriva Sannidhi in Thooppul Vilakoli (Deepa Prakasar) Perumal Koil in Kanchipuram.
 Vedanta Deshika Alayam, Mylapore
 Lakshmi Hayagreeva Temple, Moovar Nagar, Pozhichalur, Chennai-74

Pondicherry

 Sri Lakshmi Hayagriva Temple in Sri Ramakrishna Nagar, Muthialpet, Pondicherry

Karnataka
 Parakala Mutt, Mysuru - The Hayagriva idol handed down from Vedanta Desika

 Hayagreeva temple, Sattegala kollegala taluk chamarajanagar district karnataka
 Sri Lakshmi Hayagriva Temple, Tank Bund Road, Gandhi Nagar, Bangalore, Karnataka
 Sodhe Mutt, Sirsi, Karnataka

Andhra Pradesh 
 Tirumala Hayagriva temple on North Mada street of Srinivasa/ Balaji Temple, Tirumala, Tirupati, Andhra Pradesh
 Sri Lakshmi Hayagriva Swami Temple, Machilipatnam, Andhra Pradesh
 Sri Lakshmi Hayagriva Temple, Thotlakonda, Visakhapatnam, Andhra Pradesh
 Sri Lakshmi Hayagriva temple, siddhashramam, Narasimhakonda, near jonnawada, Nellore, Andhra Pradesh
 Shri Lakshmi Hayagriva Swamy, installed in birthplace of Kethanda patti Swamy at Lakshmipuram, near Kuppam, Chittoor District, Andhra Pradesh.
 Sri Lakshmi Hayagriva temple, MF Road, Hindupur Mandal, Anantapur

Telangana 
Hayagriva Swami Temple Beechupalli Telanganaa
Shri Lakshmi Hayagreeva Swamy Temple, Vangapalli Road, Yadagirigutta, Yadadri District, Telangana, 508115

Influence on other cultures
In the 2015 documentary series, The Creatures of Philippine Mythology, the spread of Hinduism and the imagery of Hayagriva is tracked through Southeast Asia. It is speculated that Hayagriva influenced the present imagery of the horse-headed Philippine mythological spirit, the Tikbalang.

An extinct genus of basal neornithischian dinosaur known from Mongolia has been named Haya griva. This name refers to the elongate horse-like skull of Haya and the appearance of this deity in the Buddhist art of Mongolia.

Demon Hayagriva 
The demon Hayagriva was a son of Kashyapa and Danu. He became the first ruler of the Danavas. In Hindu texts, it is stated that when Vishnu had created the Vedas and given them to Brahma, Shiva had decided to wipe out all of humanity except for Manu and his wife, as the rest of humanity was too corrupt to obtain the Vedas. When Hayagariva learnt that humans would be greater than the Danavas, he set out to stop the humans from obtaining the Vedas. Hayagriva visited the Satyaloka when Brahma was absent, and turned into a horse to get the attention of the Vedas (who were in the form of 4 children). He asked them why Brahma has brought them to his realm rather than taking them to humanity. After hearing their tale, Hayagriva laughed and deceived them regarding the intentions of Brahma, stating that the deity wished to keep them for himself. The Vedas were then subsequently imprisoned by the demon. Soon, Vishnu assumed his Matsya avatar and instructed Manu the manner by which he should survive the oncoming flood that Shiva would shortly send to vanquish all evil. Vishnu then slew Hayagriva in his Matsya form and freed the Vedas to bequeath them to Manu after the passage of the flood.

See also
Hayagriva (Buddhism)
Haya (dinosaur)

References

Bibliography
 Dictionary of Hindu Lore and Legend by Anna L. Dallapiccola
 
 
Devi Bhagawatam

External links

Avatars of Vishnu
Horses in Hinduism
Mythological human hybrids
Knowledge gods
Pastoral gods
Horse deities